Morgan Poaty (born 15 July 1997) is a professional footballer who plays as a left-back for Belgian First Division A club Seraing. Born in France, he plays for the Congo national team.

Career
In September 2018, Poaty joined Ligue 2 side Troyes on a season-long loan from Montpellier.

In July 2021, Poaty signed for Belgian club Seraing on a two-year contract with an option for a third year.

International career
Poaty was born in France to a Congolese mother and French father. He is a youth international for France. He debuted with the Congo national team in a 1–1 2022 FIFA World Cup qualification tie with Togo on 9 October 2021.

References

External links
 
 
 

1997 births
Living people
People from Rodez
Republic of the Congo footballers
Republic of the Congo international footballers
French footballers
France youth international footballers
Republic of the Congo people of French descent
French sportspeople of Republic of the Congo descent
Association football defenders
Rodez AF players
Montpellier HSC players
ES Troyes AC players
En Avant Guingamp players
R.F.C. Seraing (1922) players
Championnat National 2 players
Championnat National 3 players
Ligue 1 players
Ligue 2 players
Belgian Pro League players
French expatriate footballers
Expatriate footballers in Belgium
French expatriate sportspeople in Belgium
Sportspeople from Aveyron
Footballers from Occitania (administrative region)
Republic of the Congo expatriate footballers
Republic of the Congo expatriate sportspeople in Belgium